Nisha Sarang (born 2 July 1970) is an Indian actress who appears in Malayalam films and television serials. She is best known for playing the character of Neelima in the TV sitcom Uppum Mulakum, broadcast on Flowers. She won the Kerala State Television Award for Best Comedian in 2017.

Personal life
Nisha Sarang was born in Ernakulam. She has two daughters, Revathy and Revitha. The elder daughter Revathy got married in 2018.
Nisha was married to her cousin early in her teenage but later the couple got divorced. She currently lives at Kakkanad, Kochi.

Filmography

TV serials

TV shows
Parayam Nedam
Star magic as Herself
Kuttykalavara as Mentor
Kitchen magic as Contestant (Title Winner)
Adukkalappuaram
Annies Kitchen
Day with a Star
 Comedy Sthreekal
 Vellotturuli
Dream Drive
Ormakal Marikkumo
Celebrity Cookery
Comedy Stars
Gulumal
Super Challenge
Malayali Veetamma
Smart Show
Top Singer
Vijayavazhiyil Nisha Sarang
Flowers Oru Kodi
Bzinga
Star Comedy Magic

Online shows
 Rainbow Media
 Redlink
 Manorama Online
 Talkies Media
 Coffee Time (Malabar Online)
 Red FM
 Grihalakshmi
 Hot N Sour
 Nakshathra Vishesham
 Lets Cook with Nisha Sarang

Albums
 Lotto Dreams
 Pallival
 Amme Kaithozham

Awards
Flowers Comedy Awards 2016 – Best Star Pair.
Mangalam TV awards 2017– Best comedian Female
Kerala State television awards 2017 –
Best Comedian (Special Jury)
Adoor Bhasi memorial awards 2017
Most popular actress
North American Film Awards
Best actress (Television)

References

External links

https://www.malayalachalachithram.com/movieslist.php?a=10986

Actresses in Malayalam television
Indian television actresses
Living people
Actresses in Malayalam cinema
1976 births